"Que je t'aime" is a song by French singer Johnny Hallyday. It was released in 1969. The music has been composed in one night by the French artist Jean Renard, the lyrics have been written by Gilles Thibaut. Johnny Hallyday was looking for a strong song for his new show at Le palais des Sports. The song is a success, loved or at least known by most  of  the French population. The hardcore fans of Hallyday, the rock and roll' fans but also people from a more pop music atmosphere.

Commercial performance 
In 1969 the song spent 11 weeks at no. 1 on the singles sales chart in France (from 2 to 26 August and from 26 September to 4 October).

In 1988 a live version of the song recorded at Palais de Bercy in 1987 was released as a single from Hallyday's 1988 live album Johnny à Bercy. When Hallyday performed it on stage during the Bercy performances, a video of a young woman undressing  completely was projected on the back wall. The young woman in the video was French actress Sandrine Caron.

Covers 
1969 - The Combos (single), with the title Quanto ti amo, lyrics by Bruno Lauzi, (Combo – HP 8046)
1970 - Bobby Solo, with the title Quanto t'amo, lyrics by Bruno Lauzi, album Bobby Folk (Dischi Ricordi - SMRL 6065), published in Italy, Spain, Germany, Japan and Brazil
1970 - Caravelli, album Quanto ti amo (CBS – S 63832), published in Italy, France, Canada, Portugal and The Netherlands
1970 - Gionchetta (single), with the title Quanto ti amo, lyrics by Bruno Lauzi, (Junior – JR 0062)

Charts

References 

1969 songs
1969 singles
Johnny Hallyday songs
Mercury Records singles
Number-one singles in France
Songs written by Gilles Thibaut
Songs written by Jean Renard (songwriter)